Tshopo is one of the 21 new provinces of the Democratic Republic of the Congo created in the 2015 repartitioning.  It is situated in the north central part of the country on the Tshopo River, for which it is named.

Tshopo, Bas-Uele, Haut-Uele, and Ituri provinces are the result of the dismemberment of the former Orientale province.  Tshopo was formed from the Tshopo district and the independently administered city of Kisangani which retained its status as a provincial capital.

History
From 1963 to 1966, the area was constituted as the province of Haut-Congo. It was merged into Orientale Province in 1966 as, separately, the District of Tshopo and the city of Kisangani.
The Presidents (later governors) of Haut-Congo were:
 1963 – 26 June 1963: Georges Grenfell (b. 1908)
 26 June 1963 – 1964: Paul Isombuma
 1964 – August 1964: François Aradjabu
 August 1964 – 5 Nov 1966: Jean Marie Alamazani

Provincial status was re-instated to Tshopo in 2015, being formed from Tshopo District and the city of Kisangani.

Approximate correspondence between historical and current province

Territories

The provincial capital is the city of Kisangani. Territories are:

 Bafwasende
 Banalia
 Basoko
 Isangi
 Opala
 Ubundu
 Yahuma

References

External links
 Provinceorientale.cd the Government official site for Orientale Province.
 Stanleyville.be City of Kisangani Website.
 Bamanisajean.unblog.fr is Governor Jean Bamanisa's blog site.
 @Prov_orientale Twitter for Orentale Provincial Government 
 Facebook Orentale Provincial Government

 
Provinces of the Democratic Republic of the Congo